The 2018 European championships of international draughts were held from 16 to 22 December in Moscow, Russia, over 9 rounds Swiss-system tournament. There were 55 participants from 14 countries, including 17 grandmasters, 9 international masters and 15 masters of the FMJD. Competitions was at classic format and at superblitz. 6 sportsmen qualified for WC 2019.

The winner was 18-years-old Michael Semyaniuk from Belarus, silver was for Alexander Georgiev from the Russia, third was Martijn van IJzendoorn from the Netherlands.

Classic tournament

Rules and regulations
Participants played Swiss-system tournament with 9 rounds. To define the places with equal points used of Solkoff truncated coefficient. Time control was 1 hour 20 minutes plus a minute per move.

Final standings

GMI — international grandmaster

MI — international master

MF — master FMJD

CMF — candidat master FMJD

Superblitz tournament

Rules and regulations
Participants played Swiss-system tournament with 7 rounds. To define the places with equal points used of Solkoff truncated coefficient. Time control was 5 minutes plus 2 seconds per move. There were 46 participants from 7 countries, including 8 grandmasters, 5 international masters and 12 masters of the FMJD.

Final standings

References

External links
 EDC. European Championship 2018
 Site European Championship in Moscow
 Rules and Regulations European Championship 2018

2018 in draughts
2018
2018 in Russian sport
International sports competitions hosted by Russia
Sports competitions in Moscow
December 2018 sports events in Russia